The Peugeot Velv (Véhicule électrique Léger de Ville) is a concept lightweight urban electric vehicle presented in Paris on 26 September 2011.

Overview
The Velv's very short rear axle makes it closer to being a Three-wheeler.  It is a three-seater with overall length of 2.81 m.
The electric motor generates output of 32 hp (20 kW), for a top speed of 110 km/h.  Cruising range is 100 kilometers with 8.5 kWh battery capacity.

References

Velv
Production electric cars
Velv